is a railway station in the city of  Shinshiro, Aichi, Japan, operated by Central Japan Railway Company (JR Tōkai).

Lines
Torii Station is served by the Iida Line, and is located 29.3 kilometers  from the starting point of the line at  Toyohashi Station.

Station layout
The station  has a single side platform serving one bidirectional track The station building has automated ticket machines, TOICA automated turnstiles and is unattended.

Adjacent stations

|-
!colspan=5|Central Japan Railway Company

Station history
Torii Station was established on February 1, 1923, as a station on the now-defunct . The station was named Torii because it is adjacent to the reported deathplace of Torii Suneemon, a samurai famed for his bravery and death by execution during the siege of Nagashino Castle (Battle of Nagashino) in 1575. The ruin of Nagashino Castle is adjacent to the neighboring Nagashinojō Station.

On August 1, 1943, the Hōraiji Railway was nationalized along with some other local lines to form the Japanese Government Railways (JGR) Iida Line and the station was renamed to its present name.  Scheduled freight operations were discontinued in 1962. The station has been unattended since 1971. Along with its division and privatization of JNR on April 1, 1987, the station came under the control and operation of the Central Japan Railway Company. A new station building was completed in 1996.

Surrounding area
 Japan National Route 151

See also
 List of Railway Stations in Japan

References

External links

Railway stations in Japan opened in 1923
Railway stations in Aichi Prefecture
Iida Line
Stations of Central Japan Railway Company
Shinshiro, Aichi